The 2019–20 season was the 118th season of competitive association football in Spain.

Promotion and relegation

Pre-season

National teams

Spain national football team

Friendlies

UEFA Euro 2020 qualifying

Group F

Spain women's national football team

Friendlies

UEFA Euro 2021 qualifying

Group D

2020 SheBelieves Cup

UEFA competitions

2019–20 UEFA Champions League

Group stage

Group A

Group D

Group F

Group H

Knockout phase

Round of 16 

|}

Quarter-finals

|}

2019–20 UEFA Europa League

Second qualifying round 

|}

Third qualifying round 

|}

Play-off round

|}

Group stage

Group A

Group C

Group H

Knockout phase

Round of 32

|}

Round of 16

|}

Quarter-finals

|}

Semi-finals

|}

Final

2019–20 UEFA Youth League

UEFA Champions League Path

Group A

Group D

Group F

Group H

Domestic Champions Path

First round

|}

Second round

|}

Play-offs

|}

Knockout phase

Round of 16

|}

Quarter-finals

|}

Semi-finals

|}

Final

2019–20 UEFA Women's Champions League

Knockout phase

Round of 32

|}

Round of 16

|}

Quarter-finals

|}

Semi-finals

|}

Men's football

League season

La Liga

Segunda División

Promotion play-offs

Segunda División B

Cup competitions

Copa del Rey

Final

Supercopa de España

Final

Copa Federación de España

Final

Women's football

League season

Primera División

Segunda División

Cup competitions

Copa de la Reina

Supercopa de España

Final

Notes

References 

 
Football
Football
Spain
Spain